Gary Klein (born September 28, 1942 in Brooklyn, New York) is an American songwriter and Grammy nominated record producer. 
He graduated from Long Island University with a Bachelor of Arts degree in Music.

In the era which included classic rock, country, punk, disco, pop, record producer Gary Klein was well known for working across genres and often crossing over genres such as country music legends Dolly Parton and Glen Campbell with "Here You Come Again" and "Southern Nights," arguably the beginnings of country music being accepted by mainstream pop audiences. 

From Carrie Underwood to Taylor Swift it would be difficult to imagine their mainstream pop success today without looking back to Parton and Klein’s produced rendition of the Mann/Weill-penned “Here You Come Again.” Until then, like television actors trying to get into movies to capture mainstream success, country music had tried and failed to crossover many times before. Klein’s production of “Here You Come Again,” with a never done before piano intro by musician David Foster playing piano, Klein devised a sound with an ingenious idea placing masking tape across the keys inside the piano. The sound, often recreated since, had a metallic, yet subtle quality that was instantly recognizable.  Record Producer Klein liked a “memorable intro or hook,” was not alone. Nirvana’s Kurt Cobain noted on many occasions the importance of a simple catchy intro in a great pop song which Cobain, a well known Beatles fan, was trying to recreate with his own style of music.

In 1962, Gary Klein co-wrote the international pop hit song "Bobby’s Girl".
He continued songwriting for a short time including “Guess Who?”(Kornfeld/Klein), which was included on Dusty Springfield’s “Dusty” album. However, it was obvious early on that Klein had an ear and talent for record production (technology and music) which later proved true.

Singer/songwriter Tim Hardin, despite being recognized as a great songwriter in music circles had struggled to gain traction as a mainstream artist. His immense talent was difficult to capture on tape in a recording studio. In 1968, Klein produced Tim Hardin’s ”Live in Concert 3.” Hardin changed Record Producer Gary Klein labels and in 1969 his first studio release for Columbia Records “Suite for Susie Moore and Damion: We are One, One, We Are” was producer by Klein reaching 129 on Billboard’s top 200 album charts. 

In his review for Allmusic, music critic Bruce Eder wrote of the reissue that included Bird on a Wire: "There's a lot of pain in this disc, to be sure — it's hard to find a Hardin song that didn't have some — but also a level of lyrical and musical excellence that one should feel privileged to partake of."

1968, Klein produced “Tim Hardin 3 Live in Concert” 1969, Klein produced the Hardin album Suite for Susan Moore and Damion: We Are One, One, All in One.

In 1974, Mac Davis, while working on a new album wrote the song "Stop and Smell the Roses". This was a phrase Doc Severinsen, band leader of The “Tonight Show with Johnny Carson” had mentioned to Davis, giving Doc co-writing credit. However, the song was not proving an easy recording as the album was being produced by Rick Hall known as the “Father of Muscle Shoals Music." Columbia Records went to young record producer Klein, then 32, asking if he'd like to give what they were hoping to release as the first single “Stop and Smell the Roses,” a shot at production and they’d choose which producers rendition they preferred as the single.

Ultimately the Klein version won out. It went to #1 on Billboard Magazine's Adult Contemporary charts and was a top 10 pop hit.

In 1975, Klein recorded Johnny Cash's album John R. Cash. In an attempt to try something new and revive his career the "Columbia bosses" wanted Cash to record other people's material, covers. It did not prove successful. Cash later blamed it on the "bosses," finding no fault in the production. He mentioned he'd work again with Klein down the line.

In 1976-1977, Klein began working with Glen Campbell. This resulted in the pop and country #1 hit "Southern Nights". Upon Campbell's crossover to the pop charts, Dolly Parton and RCA Records wondered if he could do the same for her.

In 1977, Klein produced Dolly Parton's classic pop hit album Here You Come Again. It was the first of three albums he'd produce for Parton resulting in country and pop hit records.

In 1976, Barbra Streisand had just won an Academy Award for her song "Evergreen".
Klein began working with Streisand in 1977 on her album Superman. "My Heart Belongs to Me" hit #1 on the Adult Contemporary charts and the album went to #4 on Billboard's top 100 resulting in double platinum album.

In 1978, Streisand's Songbird album was released. It proved another double platinum album and at this point, Streisand was doing an album a year with Klein.
 
In 1979-80 Klein produced Streisand's Wet album. This included the #1 single "Enough is Enough,” a smash-hit duet with Donna Summer, often sites as the last great disco hit and end of an era. He would then produce Janis Ian’s 1981 album Restless Eyes, her last to dent the Billboard Top 200 and her last album to be released in the US until 1993.

Gary Klein stopped producing records in 1987.  He joined EMI Records/EMI Music Publishing’s CEO/Chairman Charles Koppelman in 1989 becoming an executive at the company. While there he transitioned to the publishing division full time working with CEO/Chairman Martin Bandier. 

Koppelman, Bandier and Klein originally worked together at The Entertainment Company in (1975-1982). The company was financed by Real Estate Tycoon Samuel J. LeFrak. They were led by CEO Charles Koppelman who oversaw all aspects of the company with Martin Bandier as General Counsel and Klein leading the creative side of the business as record producer.

Klein remained with Koppelman and Bandier at EMI and went on to have a 20 year run as an executive at the company.

Klein stopped producing records in 1990 and began 20-year career as an executive at EMI Music Publishing.

References

External links
Interview with Gary Klein on producing Barbra Streisand: http://barbra-archives.com/bjs_library/interview/gary_klein.htmlhttps://www.amazon.com/Encyclopedia-Record-Producers-Eric-Olsen/dp/0823076075

1942 births
Record producers from New York (state)
Living people
Musicians from Brooklyn
Songwriters from New York (state)